The Baháʼí Faith formed in the late 19th century Middle East and soon gained converts in India, the Western world, and beyond. Traveling promoters of the religion played a significant role in spreading the religion into most countries and territories during the second half of the 20th century, mostly seeded out of North America by means of the planned migration of individuals. The Baháʼí Faith was recognized as having a widespread international membership by the 1980s, and is now recognized as the second-most geographically widespread religion after Christianity.

The Baháʼí World Centre estimated over a million Bahá'ís in 1965, 5 million in 1991, and about 8 million in 2020. The official agencies of the religion have focused on publishing data such as numbers of local and national spiritual assemblies, countries and territories represented, languages and tribes represented, schools, and publishing trusts, not the total number of believers. 

Analyzing Baháʼí data on localities and activity levels, Danish sociologist Margit Warburg suggested that by 2001 registered Baháʼís reliably numbered over 5 million, and that active participants numbered approximately 900,000 (18% of registered Baháʼís). Independent estimates, such as Encyclopædia Britannica and the World Christian Encyclopedia, have listed Baháʼí membership as over 7 million, and described it as the fastest growing religion by percentage across the 20th century.

The number of adherents of a religion spread across many countries is exceptionally difficult to estimate accurately. Few national Baháʼí communities have the administrative capacity for efficient enumeration of membership, and Baháʼí membership data does not break out active participation from the total number of people who have expressed their belief. Due to its small size, few censuses or religious surveys include the Baháʼí Faith as a separate category, and some government censuses count Baháʼís as Muslims or Hindus. Country-level detail from World Christian Encyclopedia (WCE), on which many other estimates rely, attempts to count declared Baháʼís along with sympathizers, so its numbers have been consistently much higher than those of self-identifying Baháʼís.

Difficulties in enumeration

The fact that the religion is diffuse and proportionally small are major barriers to demographic research by outsiders. Even in the United States, where significant resources are dedicated to gathering data, the Baháʼí Faith is often omitted from religious surveys due to the high sample size required to reduce the margin of error. In the Middle East, especially Iran, Baháʼís face persecution, and the lack of Baháʼí administration makes it difficult to maintain a count.

Baháʼí authors Peter Smith and Moojan Momen, commenting on the difficulties of counting Baháʼís, wrote the following:

Definition of membership
Throughout the early development of the Baháʼí Faith in Iran and the West, Baháʼís often retained some of the religious identity that they converted from, many remaining members of churches and mosques. Later, Shoghi Effendi made it clear that the Baháʼí Faith was its own tradition with laws and institutions, and that Baháʼís could not remain members of other religions. The practice of maintaining membership rolls of believers began in the 1920s.

In the 1930s the Baháʼís of the United States and Canada began requiring new adherents to sign a declaration of faith, stating their belief in Baháʼu'lláh, the Báb, and ʻAbdu'l-Bahá, and affirming that there are laws and institutions to obey. The original purpose of signing a declaration card was to allow followers to apply for lawful exemption from active military service. The signature of a card later became optional in Canada, but in the US is still used for records and administrative requirements.

All local and national Spiritual Assemblies are expected to keep membership records that include declarations of faith and withdrawals, which are used for annual assembly elections. The Baháʼí system of membership thus has a system of contracting into the religion and some maintenance of the membership list is required for community functioning. Being removed from membership requires an opposite declaration of disbelief.

Children
A peculiar difficulty arises in counting Baháʼís because a tenet of the faith is that parents cannot choose the religion of their children and that 15 is the age of spiritual maturity when an individual can make the choice. Early membership rolls excluded children of Baháʼís and didn't even count them separately. In 1979 the Universal House of Justice requested that children be included separately for statistical purposes, matching the methodology of most censuses and surveys. Before that, membership rolls may have only indicated ages 21 or older (the age required for voting).

The change toward including children in statistics caused an increase in the total number of reported Baháʼís in the late 1980s, but has been consistent since.

Active vs inactive

Another difficulty arises from defining membership based on participation. The number of active participants in any religious movement will always be smaller than the number who profess belief. The prevailing norm in the Western world is that members of minority religious groups must be actively participating to be considered a member, and members of majority religious groups have a large number of passive adherents. Margit Warburg wrote, 

Warburg also noted: "Baháʼís do not lose membership status just by being inactive."

In the 1980s the Baháʼís of the United States started including “address unknown” in their membership statistics; members designated as such may profess belief but are no longer participating in community life. For example, in its 2020 Annual Report the US National Spiritual Assembly had 177,647 registered Baháʼís of all ages, only 77,290 of which had good addresses, and 57,341 total participants in core activities, with 37% of attendees from outside of the Baháʼí population. The higher American number has been challenged because it includes some who no longer believe, but the lower number with good addresses does not include inactive Baháʼís who continue their belief. As author William Garlington noted, 

Using activity data, Warburg estimated a percentage of activity in Baháʼí communities around the world and concluded that in 2001 there were reliably 5.1 million registered Baháʼís in the world and 900,000 active Baháʼís, or 18% of the total. The estimates on activity were broken out by continent: Europe 82% active, USA and Canada 71%, Australia and New Zealand 91%, Africa 22%, India 5%, Other Asia 26%, Latin America 13%, and Oceania 43%. On the question of whether the Baháʼí numbers are intentionally inflated, Warburg feels that the “numbers are not rooted in any sinister manipulation of data”.

Number of Baháʼís worldwide

Baháʼí sources

Recent
In 2020, the Secretariat of the Universal House of Justice wrote, "on the basis of information received from Baháʼí communities across the world, and on reputable external sources", the current estimate for the number of Baháʼís worldwide is "about eight million", and Baháʼís reside in "well over 100,000 localities".
A 1997 statement by the NSA of South Africa wrote: "…the Baháʼí Faith enjoys a world-wide following in excess of six million people."
As early as 1991 official estimates were of "more than five million Baháʼís", which was still in use as of 2020.
In 1989 the journal Religion published an article by Baháʼí authors Moojan Momen and Peter Smith. They observed that in the 1950s there were "probably in the region of 200,000 Baháʼís world-wide. The vast majority of these (over 90%) lived in Iran. There were probably fewer than 10,000 Baháʼís in the West and no more than 3,000 Baháʼís in the Third World, mostly India". By the end of the 1960s, they wrote, "we 'guestimate' that there may now have been about one million Baháʼís." And by 1988 they estimated about 4.5 million.
A 1987 report, published in the United States Baháʼí News reported 3.62 million Baháʼís in 1979 and 4.74 million Baháʼís in 1986, a growth of 31% over the period, or 4.4% per year on average.
The document The Promise of World Peace, produced by the Universal House of Justice in 1985, stated that the Bahá’í community has "some three to four million people".
Baháʼí author Moojan Momen wrote in 2008, "In the early 1950s, there were probably some 200,000 Baháʼís in the world. This has increased to about a million by the late 1960s, about four and a half million by the late 1980s, and over five million by 2000s."

Before 1950
The first known survey of the religion comes from an unpublished work in 1919–1920 gathered by John Esslemont and had been intended to be part of his well-known Baháʼu'lláh and the New Era. In it, consulting various individuals, he summarizes the religion's presence in Egypt, Germany, India, Iran, Iraq, Turkestan, and the United States. It did not arrive at a total but did have some regional statistics based on some individual reports. 
In 1867, 53 Baháʼís from Baghdad sent an appeal to the American Consul in Beirut for assistance in freeing Bahá'u'lláh from Ottoman captivity. According to missionary Henry Harris Jessup, "The petitioners claim that they number 40,000."

Other sources

2010 and newer
 The World Religion Database has estimated a worldwide Baháʼí population of 8,531,050 in 2020.
 In April 2017, The Economist reported that there were more than 7 million Baháʼís in the world.
 In 2016 the Yearbook of International Religious Demography 2016 noted just over 7.8 million Baháʼís in the world in 2015, having grown at an overall rate of 2.79% across the century 1910 to 2010. The countries with the largest Baháʼí populations in 2015 were, (starting with the largest): India, the US, Kenya, Viet Nam, Congo DR, Philippines, Zambia, South Africa, Iran and Bolivia, ranging upwards from 232,000 to just over 2 million in India.
In 2016 the book 12 Major World Religions wrote, "Today it numbers at least 5 million adherents and possibly more."
In 2013 the book The World's Religions in Figures: An Introduction to International Religious Demography wrote, "The Baha'i Faith is the only religion to have grown faster in every United Nations region over the past 100 years than the general population; Bahaʼi was thus the fastest-growing religion between 1910 and 2010, growing at least twice as fast as the population of almost every UN region."
In 2011, Bei Dawei said in an academic conference presentation that the Baháʼí Faith had "several hundred thousand" adherents. He noted that "estimates of five, six, or seven million are more usually encountered" but said that these estimates are projections based on self-reporting by Baháʼís and that the national figures they are based on "tend to exceed apparent Bahá'í activity by whole orders of magnitude."
In 2010, The World Religion Database stated that there were 7.3 million Baháʼís in the world. The Association of Religion Data Archives cited this estimate in 2010.
In 2010, Encyclopædia Britannica estimated a total of 7.3 million Baháʼís residing in 221 countries.
In 2010, Religions of the World: A Comprehensive Encyclopedia of Beliefs and Practices estimated 7.4 million Baháʼís in 2010, citing UN median variant figures from World Population Prospects: The 2006 Revision.

2000 to 2009
In 2009, Paula Hartz wrote in World Religions: Baha'i Faith: "Today the Baha’i Faith has some 5 million followers. It is one of the world’s fastest-growing religions. It is also probably the most diverse."
The World Factbook states that Baháʼís make up 0.12% of the world based on a 2007 estimate, corresponding to 7.9 million people.
Margit Warburg’s 2006 academic book on the Baháʼí Faith claimed, “a conservative estimate would be that in 2001 there were about 5.1 million registered Baháʼís in the world.”
The 2005 Association of Religion Data Archives estimate is of 7.6 million which is also echoed elsewhere.
In 2005, the Encyclopedia of Religion, second edition, records that:

In 2004, the Encyclopedia of the Modern Middle East and North Africa reported that "Baháʼís worldwide [are] estimated in 2001 at 5 million."
In 2003, World Book Encyclopedia reported that "there are about 5,500,000 Baháʼís worldwide." 
In 2001, World Christian Encyclopedia (2nd edition, 2001) estimated 7.1 million adherents of the Baháʼí Faith in the year 2000 representing 0.1% of the world population. The same source projected 12 million in 2025 and 18 million in 2050, assuming then-current trends were to continue. They also noted, "In government censuses Baháʼís are usually counted as Muslims or Hindus and not shown separately."
In 2000, Encyclopædia Britannica estimated a total of 7.1 million Baháʼís residing in 218 countries.
In 2000, Denis MacEoin wrote in the Handbook of Living Religions that:
"the movement has had remarkable success in establishing itself as a vigorous contender in the mission fields of Africa, India, parts of South America, and the Pacific, thus outstripping other new religions in a world-wide membership of perhaps 4 million and an international spread recently described as second only to that of Christianity. The place of Baha'ism among world religions now seems assured."

1990 to 1999
In 1998, the Academic American Encyclopedia said that the Baháʼís "are estimated to number about 2 million."
In 1997, Dictionary of World Religions said that there are "five million Baháʼís" in the world.
In 1997, Religions of the World published: "today there are about 5 million" Baháʼís.
In 1993, the Columbia Encyclopedia published: "There are about 5 million Baháʼís in the world."

1950 to 1989
In 1995, the HarperCollins Dictionary of Religion stated: "In 1985, it was estimated that there were between 1.5 to 2 million Baha'is, with the greatest areas of recent growth in Africa, India, and Vietnam."
In 1982, the World Christian Encyclopedia (1st edition, 1982) wrote of Baháʼí adherents in the world: “(1970) 2,659,400, (1980) 3,822,600 in 194 countries, (1985) 4,442,600.”
In 2010, Religions of the World: A Comprehensive Encyclopedia of Beliefs and Practices estimated 2.7 million Baháʼís in 1970, citing UN median variant figures from World Population Prospects: The 2006 Revision.
Paul Oliver wrote in World Faiths (2001) that there were "approximately five million Baháʼís" in 1963.
Paula Hartz wrote in World Religions: Baha'i Faith (2009) that by the end of Shoghi Effendi's life (1957), "the Baha'i Faith had reached more than 400,000 [adherents]."

Before 1950
The World Christian Encyclopedia (1st edition, 1982) lists the global Baháʼí population of 1900 at 9,025.
In 2004, the Encyclopedia of the Modern Middle East and North Africa reported that "By 1900, the community… had reached 50,000-100,000"
Paula Hartz wrote in World Religions: Baha'i Faith (3rd edition, 2009) that during the last years of ʻAbdu'l-Bahá's life (d. 1921), "The faith was now established in many countries around the world and its followers numbered around 100,000."

During ʻAbdu'l-Bahá's tour of North America several newspapers made claims of how large the religion was, with figures in the range of millions of people:
In 1912, a reporter in Salt Lake City claimed ʻAbdu'l-Bahá said the religion had "10,000,000 followers in the world."
On June 16, 1912, a news report introduced him as the "Persian religious leader and spiritual and temporal head of the 14,000,000 of Baháʼís scattered throughout the world."
On April 24, 1912, a newspaper article said "Baháʼísm now has 15,000,000 adherents scattered throughout the world, several hundred thousand of whom are in the United States and Canada."
On April 12, 1912, a newspaper introduced him as "head of one of the newest and most thriving religions in the world, numbering 20,000,000 souls among his followers, of whom several hundred souls are in New York."
On September 9, 1911, a news report about ʻAbdu'l-Bahá's visit to London claimed "at a moderate estimate, three million followers."

Adherents by country

Although the Baháʼí News Service has reported on the total number of Baháʼís in the world, the data is not broken out by country.

The World Christian Encyclopedia (WCE), and its successor The World Christian Database (WCD), is an authority on membership data for religions in the world, and its decades-long study by David Barrett and co-workers is a basis for many other estimates of Baháʼís in the world, such as ARDA. The data were released in editions of 1982, 2001, and 2018, and includes a break down by country. The WCE data has consistently reported higher numbers of Baháʼís than the reports of Baháʼí institutions. Danish researcher Margit Warburg studied Baháʼí membership data and feels that the WCE data is overstated for Baháʼís. For instance, WCE reports an estimated 1,600 Baháʼís in Denmark in 1995 and 682,000 Baháʼís in the USA. The number of registered Baháʼís at the same time were 240 and 130,000, respectively. Peter Smith found that the WCE data is meant to include "members plus those who regularly attend Baháʼí events, that is including a wider circle of sympathizers as well as declared Baháʼís".

The Association for Religious Data Archives (ARDA) is "a collection of surveys, polls, and other data submitted by the foremost scholars and research centers in the world." It gathers data from, "the US Census Bureau's International Data Base, the US State Department's International Religious Freedom Report, the United Nations Human Development Reports, and others" including World Christian Database.

Adherents by continent

The following data comes from World Christian Encyclopedia (1st ed., 1982).

The following data comes from World Christian Encyclopedia (2st ed., 2001).

In "The Baha'i Faith 1957–1988: A Survey of Contemporary Developments" (Religion: 1989), Baháʼí authors Momen and Smith provide the following estimates of the Baháʼís in the world over 3 decades, broken out by cultural areas. They derived numbers from, "calculation of approximate numbers from the number of Bahá'í organizations; extrapolating back from the official figures for the number of individual Bahá'ís provided more recently; estimates provided by informed Bahá'ís; and when the first draft of this paper was completed, a copy was sent to the Department of Statistics in Haifa and the present table incorporates some of the statistical information given in the reply to this, dated 8 July 1988."

Other statistics from Baháʼí sources

Further data on National Spiritual Assemblies

See also
History of the Baháʼí Faith
Spiritual Assembly
Socioeconomic development and the Baháʼí Faith
Baháʼí divisions

Footnotes

Citations

References

Books

 

|

Encyclopedias

Journals

News reports

Other sources

Further reading

External links
 Bahá'í World News Service (2013). List and Map of 114 Bahá'í Conferences

Bahá'í Faith by country
Religious demographics